Jon Snow may refer to:

 Jon Snow (journalist) (born 1947), British newscaster
 Jon Snow (character), character from George R. R. Martin's novel series A Song of Ice and Fire

See also
 John Snow (disambiguation) 
 Jack Snow (disambiguation)